Acidia cognata is a species of fly in the family Tephritidae.

Distribution
This species can be found in most of Europe, including Great Britain, Ireland, the Netherlands, Belgium, Albania, Austria, Bulgaria, Czech Republic, Denmark, Finland, France, Germany, Hungary, Italy, Lithuania, Norway, Poland, Romania, Russia, Slovakia, Sweden, Switzerland, UkraineAnd Brazil. @

Habitat
These flies mainly occur in  meadows  and spruce forest edges.

Description
Acidia cognata is a relatively large species, the body length reaching , while the wing length reaches . It has a golden orange-brown body. The head is  pale yellow-white, with bright red eyes and a dull stripe on the forehead. The wings are markedly colored and shows five dark grey or brownish bands, which are interconnected. The first bandage begins at the base of the wings, while the fifth band lies on the wing tip.

Biology
Adults flies from May until early October. Larvae are oligophagous leaf miners of a variety of plants in the family Asteraceae, mainly feeding from August until October on Arctium lappa, Petasites fragrans, Petasites albus, Petasites hybridus, Petasites paradoxus, Petasites spurius, Homogyne alpine and Tussilago farfara. Pupation occurs externally, in the soil.

Gallery

References

External links
 
 
 Britisk leafminers
 Plant Parasites of Europe

Trypetinae
Insects described in 1817
Articles containing video clips
Muscomorph flies of Europe